Charles, Charley, or Charlie Hill may refer to:

Arts and entertainment
 Charles Hill (painter) (1824–1915), engraver, painter and arts educator in South Australia
 Charles Christopher Hill (born 1948), American artist and printmaker
 Charlie Hill (1951–2013), Native American stand-up comic

Politics
 Charles A. Hill (1833–1902), American politician (Illinois)
 Charles Lumley Hill (1840–1909), pastoralist, businessman and politician in Queensland, Australia
 Charles L. Hill (1869–1957), American political candidate (Wisconsin)

Sports
 Charles Hill (cyclist) (1886–1961), British Olympic cyclist
 Charley Hill (baseball), American baseball player
 Charles Hill (cricketer) (1903–1982), Irish cricketer
 Charlie Hill (footballer) (1918–1998), Welsh footballer
 Charlie Hill (boxer) (1930–2010), Scottish boxer
 Charles Hill (American football) (born 1980), American football player
 Charlie Hill (cricketer) (born 1985), English cricketer

Others
 Charles Shattuck Hill (1868–after 1909), American civil engineer, author and editor
 Charles Rowland Clegg-Hill, 6th Viscount Hill (1876–1957), British peer
 Charles Hill, Baron Hill of Luton (1904–1989), English administrator, doctor and television executive
 Charles Hill (diplomat) (1936–2021), American diplomat and scholar
 Charles E. Hill (1881–1936), professor of political science at George Washington University
 Charles C. Hill (born 1945), Canadian curator
 Charles W. L. Hill, British-born academic
 Charles Blair Hill (died 2011), American man shot to death by two BART police officers in San Francisco

Other uses
 Charles Hill, Botswana, a village in Botswana
 Charles Hill & Sons, former shipbuilder and shipyard in Bristol, England

See also 
 Charles D. Hilles (1867–1949), American politician (New York state)
 Hill (surname)
 Carl Hill (disambiguation)
 

Hill, Charles